Kadeena Cox  (born 10 March 1991) is a parasport athlete competing in T38 para-athletics sprint events and  C4 para-cycling and British television presenter. She was part of the 2015 IPC Athletics World Championships and the 2016 UCI Para-cycling Track World Championships, in which she won world titles in the T37 100m and C4 500m time trial respectively.

Competing for Great Britain at the 2016 Summer Paralympics, in both athletics and cycling, she won a bronze medal in the Women's 100m T38 sprint, before winning a gold medal in the Women's C4-5 cycling time trial, and another gold in the T38 400m sprint, becoming the first British Paralympian to win golds in multiple sports at the same Games since Isabel Barr at the 1984 Summer Paralympics.

In 2021 she appeared as a contestant on ITV's I'm a Celebrity...Get Me Out of Here!. In September 2021 Cox was the winner of the sixteenth series of BBC's Celebrity MasterChef.

Early and personal life
Cox was born on 10 March 1991 in Leeds, West Yorkshire, England to Jamaican migrants. Her first school was Bracken Edge Primary in Chapeltown, Leeds. She attended Wetherby High School before going to Manchester Metropolitan University where she studied physiotherapy.

Sporting career

As an able bodied athlete
Cox began sprinting competitively at the age of 15 after her hockey coach suggested she try the sport. Over the next three years she competed at regional under-17 meets gaining several podium finishes in the 100m events. In 2007, she added the 60m and 200m to her repertoire, taking bronze in the U17 events at both the Manchester Open and the England Athletics Open Championships in the 60m that year. By 2009 Cox was competing throughout the athletics season, recording personal bests of 12.60s in the 100m and 25.58s in the 200m, both at the Yorkshire & Humberside County Championships. In 2012 Cox was entering national events and recorded a new personal best in the 200m in the BUCS Championships held at the Olympic Park, a result which saw her take bronze. In 2013, she broke the 12 second barrier in the 100m for the first time, recording a time of 11.97 at the Northern Athletics Championships. She subsequently set a personal best of 11.93s for the 100m the same year. In addition to running, before her illness Cox was vying for a place on the British skeleton team.

On 18 May 2014, Cox entered the Loughborough International: two days later she was rushed to hospital after showing odd symptoms and was diagnosed as having a stroke. After two months of physiotherapy she recovered back to normal health and began training again. Then on 15 September 2014 she experienced burning sensations in her right arm, which over the following few days worsened to numbness in her arm and right leg and she was again taken to hospital with suspicions of a stroke. After extensive tests she was diagnosed with multiple sclerosis.

As a parasport sprinter
Intent on making the 2016 Summer Paralympics in Rio, Cox was classified as both a T37 track and field athlete, to continuing her sprinting career, and a C2 track cyclist.

A month later, Cox was selected for the Great Britain athletics team to compete at the 2015 IPC Athletics World Championships in Doha, where she entered the T37 100m and 200m sprints. In the heats leading up to the final of the 100m sprint, Cox posted a time of 13.59s to beat the world record set by France's Mandy Francois-Elie. Later that day she ran in the 100m T37 final, taking the gold medal in a time of 13:60, beating teammate Georgina Hermitage into second place. Her final event of the championship, the T37 200m sprint, ended in controversy after she missed registration by a minute and was disqualified from the race.

In June 2016, after securing a place at the 2016 Summer Paralympics as a T37 athlete, Cox was reclassified as a T38 category athlete, a classification for less-disabled athletes. This threw her hopes to race at Rio into jeopardy as Britain already fielded two other athletes, Sophie Hahn and Olivia Breen, who had posted faster times as T38 sprinters. Despite the classification change, Cox was selected for the Rio Paralympics in July 2016. At the Games she took a gold in the T38 400m, a silver in the T35-38  relay and a bronze in the T38 100m. She also set a new world record of 1:00.71 to take the gold medal in the T38 400m. Cox was subsequently selected as the flag-bearer for the British team at the closing ceremony.

A late addition to the GB squad, Cox competed in the T38 400m at the delayed 2020 Summer Paralympics in Tokyo. She finished 4th with a time of 1:01.16, her season best.

As a para-cyclist
In September 2015, Cox entered the British National Track Championships where she took the gold medal in the C1-5 Mixed Gender Sprint Time Trial.

In March 2016, Cox represented Great Britain at the UCI Para-cycling Track World Championships in Montichiari. Despite being reclassified as a C4 cyclist the day before the event, she still went on to win gold in the 500m time trial with a world record of 37.456s. On 1 August, Cox was named in the Great Britain team to compete at the Rio Paralympics with the potential to race in the 500m time trial (C4/C5) and the road race (C4/C5). Cox won gold in the 500m time trial in the 2016 Paralympics: her time of 34.598 seconds also set a new world record.
At the delayed Tokyo Paralympics, Cox defended her time trial title, again winning gold in a world record time of 34.812 seconds.

Awards and honours 
Cox
was appointed Member of the Order of the British Empire (MBE) in the 2017 New Year Honours for services to athletics and Officer of the Order of the British Empire (OBE) in the 2022 New Year Honours for services to athletics and cycling.

In March 2017, Cox was awarded the Sporting Equals Sportswoman of the Year at the Lycamobile British Ethnic Diversity Sports Awards (BEDSAs) held at the London Hilton on Park Lane.

On 5 June 2022 Cox, riding a cycle alongside Sir Chris Hoy, headed "The Time of Our Lives" section of the Platinum Jubilee Pageant.

Media appearances 
She appeared on Celebrity Mastermind in December 2016, scoring just 3 points with her specialist subject Arsenal F.C., and no points at all in the general knowledge round. This is the lowest ever score. She won the second Celebrity Robot Wars 2016 episode later that month with her collaboration with Ellis Ware (who drove Pulsar in the preceding regular series), with a robot called Kadeena Machina, a robot with a vertical disc, which won all four of its fights, the only robot to do so.

In 2017, she took part in the British television winter sports show The Jump, but had her funding suspended while on the show due to the number of injuries contestants sometimes have. In April 2018, Cox took part in The Great Stand Up to Cancer Bake Off on Channel 4 in aid of Stand Up to Cancer. In 2021, she appeared on Celebrity Gogglebox with fellow athlete Adam Gemili. In September 2021, Cox won the sixteenth series of BBC's Celebrity MasterChef, beating Joe Swash and Megan McKenna.

In November 2021, Cox was announced as a contestant on the twenty-first series of I'm a Celebrity...Get Me Out of Here!. She was second to be eliminated. Then in June 2022, Cox made a cameo appearance in an episode of the BBC soap opera Doctors.

References

External links

 
 
 

1991 births
English female sprinters
Living people
World record holders in Paralympic athletics
British disabled sportspeople
Sportswomen with disabilities
Track and field athletes with disabilities
English track cyclists
English female cyclists
Black British sportswomen
English people of Jamaican descent
Paralympic bronze medalists for Great Britain
Paralympic silver medalists for Great Britain
Paralympic gold medalists for Great Britain
Athletes (track and field) at the 2016 Summer Paralympics
Cyclists at the 2016 Summer Paralympics
Medalists at the 2016 Summer Paralympics
Officers of the Order of the British Empire
Sportspeople from Leeds
Para-cyclists
Paralympic medalists in athletics (track and field)
Paralympic medalists in cycling
Paralympic athletes of Great Britain
Athletes (track and field) at the 2020 Summer Paralympics
Medalists at the 2020 Summer Paralympics
Cyclists at the 2020 Summer Paralympics
I'm a Celebrity...Get Me Out of Here! (British TV series) participants
People with multiple sclerosis